Ilan Ben-Dov (born 16 January 1957, in Tel Aviv, Israel) is an Israeli businessman and investor.

Business career
Ilan Ben-Dov started in business at the age of 17, working as a games operator at a swimming pool. He began importing SEGA electronic games 13 years later, before founding Suny Electronics Ltd in 1991. In 1993, during a Tel Aviv Stock Exchange bubble, Suny raised NIS 20 million in an IPO. In 1998, Ben-Dov obtained the Israel franchise to import Samsung Electronics cellular telephones, and acquired control of the Achla web portal from Avi and Hagit Maor in September 1999. Acquisitions continued to grow the empire, and in January 2001 Ben-Dov acquired the Tapuz web portal for $450,000 through Achla. In March 2000 Pelephone and Ben-Dov launched GoNext, the first wireless Internet company in Israel.

On 29 October 2002, Ben-Dov sold all of his shares in GoNext to Pelephone for NIS 42 million. On 27 December 2004, he sold 3% of IDB Holding Corp. to Nochi Dankner.

In January 2004 he founded together with Oren Levy, Dan Chen, Guy Alon Eliav and Nir Ofir a video chat website that he called BlogTV in Israel. in 2006 the website offered its service to the rest of the world and became popular in the US and Canada. in December 2007 the Israeli TV show "To Catch a Predator" by Arutz Eser was devoted to impersonating 13 years old girl named "Lotem13" and detaining male adults who contacted her via the BlogTV chat for sexual liaisons.

On 4 April 2005, he bought more 6.3% of Giron shareholding. In 2005, Ben-Dov expanded his financing activity and founded Tao Tsuot Ltd., which made a number of leveraged investments in public companies. However, these investments were made at the height of the bull market. Tao took a severe battering during the market crash in 2008, posting heavy losses as share prices crashed, and it fell into a shareholders' equity deficit.

In 2008 Ben-Dov restructured Suny's holdings and sold the Samsung cellular telephone import business to Suny subsidiary Scailex Corp. ltd. Except for importing Samsung cellular telephones, Suny was active in the Internet service field through its controlling interest in Internet portal Tapuz People Ltd and BlogTV. In August 2009 Ben Dov acquired control of Partner Communications from Hutchison Telecommunications International for NIS 4.7 billion (about $1.38 billion), in one of the biggest transactions the Israeli market had seen.  This was financed through loans provided by the financial institutions that bought his bonds, the banks, and Hutchison's seller's loan.  On 10 January 2010, Ben-Dov sold 4.92% of Azorim Investment, Development and Construction Ltd. for NIS 36.8 million. In October 2010 Ben-Dov bought 012 Smile for NIS 1.5 billion. In December 2012 Ben dov sold 30.7 percent of Partner Communications along with control of the company to Haim Saban. On 6 May 2013 Ben Dov put Tapuz up for sale.

On 10 July 2013 a Court ordered a liquidation for Ben-Dov's Tao. The following day Bank Leumi granted a temporary foreclosure order against Ben-Dov's assets. In September 2013 Ben Dov sold the Tapuz web portal to Trendline Information and Communication Services Ltd. for NIS 4.3 million. On 23 June 2014 Scailex board ousts Ilan Ben-Dov as chairman.

Ben-Dov has made a number of financial investments, and Suny has become a party at interest in several companies, including IDB Holding Corp. Ltd.

Holdings
 User trend (formerly: Tapuz people) 
 BlogTV
 Partner Communications Company Ltd.
 012 Smile
 Suny.com Ltd.
 Derech HaLotus Ltd.
 Refuat Halotus Ltd.
 Tao Tsuot Real Estate Ltd.
 Ben Dov Investments Ltd.
 I. Ben Dov Investments Ltd.
 Harmony (Ben Dov) Ltd.

References

External links 
 Ilan Ben-Dov profile at businessweek.com
  Zorba the Buddhist
  Ben-Dov: Partner was too big for me
  Ilan Ben Dov's Partner venture ending in tears
 The rise of Ilan Ben-Dov
  Ben-Dov restructuring Tao Tsuot debt
 Ilan Ben-Dov pursuing stock sale, bond offering to meet debt over Partner
 Ben-Dov is only the first debt victim
  Ben-Dov: Hutchison can't quit Partner agreement
 Ben-Dov brought Tao low, but the watchdogs missed the signs

1957 births
Living people
Israeli billionaires
Israeli chief executives
Israeli investors
Israeli Jews
People from Tel Aviv